Penny or internationally Penny Market (in Bavaria and Austria Penny Markt) is a German-French discount supermarket chain based in Germany, which operates 3,550 stores. 
The market was founded by Leibbrand Gruppe in 1973; since 1989, it has been fully owned by the Rewe Group.

In France, the chain was bought in 2005 by the Ed brand of the Carrefour group. In 2010, it operated approximately 3,000 stores across 6 countries in Europe. In May 2014, Penny is present in Germany, Austria, Bulgaria, Hungary, Italy, Czech Republic, Romania and soon in Turkey. After taking over 7 stores in Liguria from Tuodì in October 2017 for € 9.2 million, it is present in Italy with 357 points of sale distributed in 17 regions, served by 7 distribution centers.

Operations

Penny Market exited the Bulgarian market on October 31, 2015.

See also
REWE Group
Billa
Selgros

References

External links

 Penny
 Penny Germany
 Penny Markt Austria
 Penny Market Italy
 Penny Market Hungary
 Penny Market Czech Republic
 Penny Market Romania

Companies based in Cologne
Retail companies established in 1973
Companies established in 1973
Supermarkets of Austria
Supermarkets of Bulgaria
Supermarkets of the Czech Republic
Supermarkets of Germany
Supermarkets of Hungary
Supermarkets of Italy
Supermarkets of Romania
German brands
Trading companies